Johannes Andreas Truter, also known as Sir John Truter (11 October 1763 - 5 June 1845), was the judicial officer of the Cape Colony and president of the Court of Justice at the Cape of Good Hope. He was also a South African Freemason and member of the Grand Orient of the Netherlands in South Africa.

References

Afrikaner people
1763 births
1845 deaths
Cape Colony judges
19th-century South African judges
Leiden University alumni
South African Freemasons